Emely de Heus (born 10 February 2003) is a Dutch racing driver competing in the 2022 W Series.

Personal life
De Heus was born in Mijnsheerenland, Netherlands.  Her father is Bert de Heus, a veteran amateur driver in the 24H Series endurance racing championship. Her family own and operate De Heus Tractors, based in Mijnsheerenland.

De Heus is currently studying for a degree in marketing and communications at the Johan Cruyff Institute.

Career

Karting
Emely de Heus competed in the 2019 and 2020 Rotax Max Challenge International Trophy in karting. In 2019, she secured 4 points and finished in 27th position overall. In 2020, she improved to 23rd place with 45 points. In February 2020 she won the Dutch Wintercup in Senior Karting at Berghem. That same year, she amassed 239 points in the Dutch Rotax Max Senior National Championship, finishing 4th overall.

F4 Spanish Championship
For the 2021 season, De Heus made her debut in single seater racing in the F4 Spanish Championship. She competed for Dutch team, MP Motorsport.

De Heus competed in all 21 races of the season.  She finished in 29th place in the drivers standings and won the 2021 Female Trophy.

W Series
In early 2022, De Heus was announced as a competitor for the 2022 W Series season. In February she completed a test at Inde Motorsports Ranch, Arizona and also drove at the March test at Circuit de Barcelona-Catalunya in Spain where she completed 134 laps. De Heus competed for Sirin Racing alongside fellow Dutch racer Beitske Visser. Her best result was 10th in the first round of the season in Miami.

Formula 4 UAE Championship
In January 2023, it was announced De Heus would compete in the 2023 Formula 4 UAE Championship with MP Motorsport. Her best finish was 21st place at Kuwait Motor Town.

F1 Academy
In March, De Heus was announced as a driver for the brand new F1 Academy series.  She will compete in 2023 with MP Motorsport.

Racing Record

Racing career summary 

* Season still in progress.

Complete F4 Spanish Championship results 
(key) (Races in bold indicate pole position) (Races in italics indicate fastest lap)

Complete W Series results
(key) (Races in bold indicate pole position) (Races in italics indicate fastest lap)

Complete F4 UAE Championship results 
(key) (Races in bold indicate pole position) (Races in italics indicate fastest lap)

* Season still in progress.

References

External links 
 Official Instagram
 
 Profile at W Series

Living people
2003 births
People from Binnenmaas
Dutch racing drivers
Dutch female racing drivers
Spanish F4 Championship drivers
W Series drivers
Karting World Championship drivers
MP Motorsport drivers
Sportspeople from South Holland
UAE F4 Championship drivers
F1 Academy drivers